Pseudotolida tokyoensis is a beetle in the genus Pseudotolida of the family Mordellidae. It was described in 1959 by Nomura & Kato.

References

Mordellidae
Beetles described in 1959